Pelican Creek may refer to:
 Pelican Creek, Queensland, a locality in the Barcaldine Region, Queensland, Australia
 Pelican Creek (Bahamas), a river in The Bahamas